Benjamin Campbell Thornal (October 18, 1908 – November 4, 1970) was a justice of the Florida Supreme Court.

Thornal was a justice of the Florida Supreme Court from 1955 to 1970, and served as the court's chief justice from 1965 to 1967.  He died in 1970, while still a serving member of the court.

Born in Charleston, South Carolina, Thornal graduated from the University of Florida College of Law with a bachelor of laws degree in 1930, and became a partner in the Orlando law firm of Baker & Thornal.  He was commissioned as a lieutenant in the U.S. Navy during World War II.  He served three separate stints as the city attorney for the City of Orlando, and one term as the county attorney for Orange County. He was selected for the Florida Supreme Court in 1955.

He died in Durham, North Carolina, while being treated for cancer at the Duke University Medical Center.  He was 62 years old.

References

External links
 B. Campbell Thornal - University of Florida alumni profile

1908 births
1970 deaths
Justices of the Florida Supreme Court
20th-century American judges
Chief Justices of the Florida Supreme Court
Fredric G. Levin College of Law alumni